The Südostbahn (German, literally meaning "South-Eastern Railway") – commonly abbreviated to SOB – is a Swiss railway company, and a  network in Central and Eastern Switzerland. It resulted from the merger of the original SOB with the Bodensee–Toggenburg railway (BT) at the end of 2001.

The Schweizerische Südostbahn AG (Swiss South-Eastern Railway SA) is a small private railway jointly owned by the cantonal and federal governments as an Aktiengesellschaft (AG).

Network 
The rail network of the Südostbahn (SOB) consists of that formerly owned by BT in northeast Switzerland (between Lake Constance and Toggenburg): 
 Romanshorn–St. Gallen St. Fiden line,
 St. Gallen–Herisau–Degersheim–Wattwil line, and 
 (Wattwil–)Ebnat-Kappel–Krummenau–Nesslau-Neu Sankt Johann line,

and that previously owned by the original SOB located predominantly in Central Switzerland:
 Rapperswil–Pfäffikon SZ line,
 Pfäffikon SZ–Freienbach SOB–Wollerau–Samstagern–Schindellegi-Feusisberg–Biberbrugg–Altmatt–Rothenthurm–Biberegg–Sattel-Aegeri–Steinerberg–Arth-Goldau line, and 
 Einsiedeln–Biberbrugg–Schindellegi-Feusisberg–Samstagern–Wädenswil line.

Since 2006, SOB also owns Wattwil station and the railway from Wattwil to Ebnat-Kappel, which until then belonged to SBB CFF FFS. The railway stations of Romanshorn, St. Gallen, and Pfäffikon SZ, and the railway tracks between St. Gallen St. Fiden–St. Gallen, Wattwil (except railway station)–Rapperswil, and Arth-Goldau–Luzern are owned by Swiss Federal Railways, but are used by SOB for its services.

In total, the SOB network measures , and comprises the following lines:
 Romanshorn – St. Gallen St. Fiden
 St. Gallen – Wattwil – Nesslau-Neu St. Johann
 Rapperswil – Pfäffikon SZ (Seedamm)
 Pfäffikon SZ – Arth-Goldau (including  common with Wädenswil–Einsiedeln)
 Wädenswil – Einsiedeln

The adhesion railway network spreads over mountainous terrain, with a maximum slope of 50‰ (5 %) between Wädenswil/Pfäffikon SZ and Biberbrugg, and between Rothenthurm and Arth-Goldau. The lowest altitude on the SOB network is found at Romanshorn ( a.s.l.), and the highest at Biberegg ( a.s.l.), between Rothenthurm and Sattel-Aegeri. The highest elevation on the section between Nesslau-Neu St. Johann and St. Gallen is reached near Degersheim ( a.s.l.).

The network is mostly a single-track railway, with intermittent double-tracks ( in total) present in sections where trains cross regularly. The entire network is electrified since 1939.

Infrastructure 
The direct connection from Bodensee via Zürichsee towards Vierwaldstättersee, which follows the Alpine foothills, was achieved by numerous civil engineering works. These consist of a series of viaducts and tunnels. Engineering structures account for one eighth of the total SOB rail network. They comprise: 
 19 tunnels through  of mountains.

It is also the longest bridge on the SOB network and was built between 1908 and 1910. Many bridges of the SOB network were constructed by BT.

The tunnel was constructed between 1905 and 1910. It was built between 1907 and 1910. Most tunnels of the SOB network belonged to BT previously.

Rolling stock 

In the 1990s, the former Südostbahn (SOB) ordered four two-piece NPZ (Neuer Pendelzug; English: "new commuter train") sets (RBDe 566 + ABt), which were delivered from the first production series in 1995, bearing numbers RBDe 566 400-403. Initially, the SOB opted not to convert any intermediate cars for use with these trainsets. Thus, the SOB DVTs differed from those of the SBB CFF FFS by the addition of a  first class compartment. The motor coaches of the NPZ sets, however, were identical to those of SBB CFF FFS. The SOB later converted several intermediate cars to elongate their trainsets (three-/four-car sets).

The  NPZ first class control cars (ABt) existed for the two types of RBDe 566 that SOB owned at that time (RBDe 566 071-076 ex BT and RBDe 566 077-080 ex original SOB of the type also used by SBB CFF FFS). Until 2019, nine second class control cars (BDt) were used for the Voralpen-Express sets with Re 456, Re 446 or Re 420 (the latter occasionally leased from SBB-CFF-FFS) locomotives. After the merger of the original SOB with BT, the four NPZ sets were repainted in 2003 in the livery of the new SOB, with the sides of the vehicles painted light and dark gray, and the nose and border between side and roof painted red. They operated throughout the SOB network as RBDe 566 077-080.

The NPZ sets were later replaced by Stadler FLIRT EMUs (four-car-sets), delivered between 2007 and 2013 (RABe 526 041-526 063). The latter were painted in the most recent SOB livery: silver, with red window band, and light gray doors. Additional FLIRT-III four-car-sets were delivered between 2019 and 2021 (RABe 526 001-526 006). The FLIRT/FLIRT-III sets operate as S-Bahn service, but also as extension units during peak-hours on InterRegio lines, i.e., for the named trains Voralpen-Express/Treno Gottardo/Aare Linth, for which new copper-red painted Traverso eight-car EMU sets (RABe 526 101/201-526 117/217) started operations between 2019 and 2021. Some of the FLIRT/FLIRT-III sets are named after mountain peaks along SOB operated lines. The names are indicated near the ends of the trainsets.

Services

InterRegio 
Südostbahn (SOB) operates InterRegio (IR) services as named trains Voralpen-Express, Treno Gottardo, and Aare Linth. Due to the clock-face scheduling, the  Swiss rail network offers passengers timely connections at most railway stations. Since 2018, most InterRegio lines in Switzerland are numbered and color-coded for more clarity.

Voralpen-Express  

From 1992 to 2013, Voralpen-Express (English: "Prealps Express") was jointly operated with the Swiss Federal Railways (SBB CFF FFS), and it continued as a regional train between St. Gallen and Romanshorn. It is since operated solely by SOB, and the trains turn around in St. Gallen. Between 2013 and 2019, Voralpen-Express ran under its own train category (VAE). It is now again classified as InterRegio (unnumbered) after it was briefly categorized as Panorama Express (PE). The name Voralpen-Express is still indicated on platform displays and mentioned during train departure announcements at the platform.

 Voralpen-Express:  – 

Luzern –  –  –  –  –  –  –  –  –  –  –  –  – St. Gallen

Treno Gottardo  

Treno Gottardo (Italian for "Gotthard train") is jointly operated by SOB and SBB CFF FFS and runs entirely on the network owned by the latter. It connects the city of Locarno, in the Italian speaking part of Switzerland, alternately with the cities of Basel and Zurich, both located in the German speaking part of the country. Trains to/from Basel reverse direction at Lucerne (dead-end station). It was launched in December 2020, but trains turned around at Bellinzona until spring 2021 due to construction work between Bellinzona and Locarno at that time.

  – 

Basel SBB –  – Luzern – Arth-Goldau –  –  –  –  –  –  –  –  –  –  –  –  –  –  –  – Locarno

  – 

Zürich HB –  – Arth-Goldau – Schwyz – Brunnen – Flüelen – Erstfeld – Göschenen – Airolo – Ambri-Piotta – Faido – Lavorgo – Bodio TI – Biasca – Castione-Arbedo – Bellinzona – Cadenazzo – Tenero – Locarno

Treno Gottardo follows the scenic route of the Gotthard Railway. This "old route" crosses the Alps through the ca.  long Gotthard Tunnel between Göschenen ( a.s.l.) and Airolo ( a.s.l.). It uses a series of spiral loops and horseshoe curves (partly in tunnels) to quickly gain altitude, or to lose altitude on the other side of the tunnel, respectively.

Aare Linth 
The named train Aare Linth was launched in December 2021. It connects Chur, the capital of Canton Grisons, with the Swiss capital of Bern. The trains reverse direction at Zurich mainstation (Zürich HB), which is a cul-de-sac. The train is named after the Aare and Linth rivers, which it follows/crosses on its journey. Aare Linth is operated by SOB in cooperation with SBB CFF FFS; it runs entirely on the Swiss Federal Railways network. Stadler "Traverso" trainsets operate on this InterRegio line except during rush hour, when higher-capacity rolling stock of SBB CFF FFS is used.

  – 

Bern –  –  –  –  –  – Zürich HB –  –  – Pfäffikon SZ –  –  –  –  –  –  – Chur

S-Bahn 

Südostbahn (SOB) operates the following S-Bahn services in Central and Eastern Switzerland:

 Lucerne S-Bahn:
   –  –  –  –  –  – 
 St. Gallen S-Bahn:
  (Alpstein circle route, Alpsteinrundfahrt)  –  –  –  –  –  –  –  –  –  –  –  –  –  –  –  –  –  –  –  –  –  –  –  –  –  –  –  (inversion of direction) –  –  –  –  –  –  –  –  –  – St. Gallen (operates in both directions)
   –  –  – Uznach –  – Schänis – Ziegelbrücke –  –  –  –  –  –  –  ( –  –  –  –  –  –  – , only during off-peak ours)
 Zürich S-Bahn:
   – Biberbrugg –  –  –  –  – 
  Einsiedeln – Biberbrugg – Schindellegi-Feusisberg – Samstagern –  –  –  –  –  –  – Rapperswil
 Not formally part of an S-Bahn network:
  (March shuttle) Ziegelbrücke –  –  –  –  (operates only Monday–Friday during peak-hours)

External links 

  
 Voralpen-Express website 
 Treno Gottardo website 
 Aare Linth website

References 

Railway companies of Switzerland
Transport in the canton of St. Gallen
Transport in the canton of Zürich
Canton of Schwyz
Südostbahn